The Free Evangelical Church was formed as a result of the split in the Evangelical Church in New Caledonia and the Loyalty Islands. Its leader was Raymond Chaelemagne a missionary in the Kanak people. The Paris Missions Society requested him to return to Paris, but numerous teachers and supporters requested him to stay. This created the split. Ministers are men only. It has 74 parishes and 2,000 members. Reconciliation with The Evangelical Church in New Caledonia began in 1992.

References

Reformed denominations in Oceania